Osann is a surname of German origin. Notable people with the surname include:

Emil Osann (1787–1842), German physician and physiologist 
Friedrich Gotthilf Osann (1794–1858), German classical philologist, brother of Emil and Gottfried
Gottfried Osann (1796–1866), German chemist and physicist, brother of Emil and Friedrich
Kate Osann, American cartoonist

See also
Osann-Monzel,  a municipality in Rhineland-Palatinate, Germany

German-language surnames